Estonian Autosport Union (abbreviated EAU) is one of the sports governing bodies in Estonia which deals with Estonian autosport.

EAU is one of the organizer of Estonian Open Rally Championships and Estonian Grand Prix.

EAU is a member of Fédération Internationale de l'Automobile (FIA).

References

External links
 

Sports governing bodies in Estonia
Motorsport in Estonia
National sporting authorities of the FIA